Starting Point is a television show on CNN in the United States.

Starting Point may also refer to:
Starting Point (film), a 2015 Polish short film
A Starting Point, an American political website

See also 
Starting Point Directory, a web directory
Start Point (disambiguation)